Fafda is a popular Indian snack native to Gujarat. In many festivals, fafda is the most preferred snack. Fafda is rectangular in shape and yellowish in color.It is called ‘Laththa’in MALLAWAN hardoi UP

History 

Fafda got famous by a festival named Dusherra. Traditionally, fafda and jalebi are the most sought-after sweet and salt combination in Gujarati cuisine. The two snacks are popular as breakfast items among Gujarati people.

Preparation and serving 
To create Fafda, besan (Gram flour), oil, carom seeds (ajwain), papad khar, salt to taste. Amalgamate all the ingredients in a bowl and create a mixture, make dough of the mixture using enough water and Make small rolls of the dough and roll in a cylindrical shape, and after flattening, deep-fry till it turns crispy. It is served with a chutney and salty fried-green chilis. Fafda is also accompanied with spicy shredded vegetables colloquially called "sambharo". The vegetables in the sambharo can be carrots or shredded spicy papaya.

See also 
Gujarati cuisine
Indian cuisine

References

Indian cuisine
Gujarati cuisine